The Democratic-Republican Party is the modern name for a US political party that existed from 1791 to 1825. Democratic Republican may also refer to:

Democratic-Republican Party (1844)
Democratic Republican Alliance, a French political party
Democratic Republican Party (South Korea)
Democratic Republican Party (South Korea, 2008)
Democratic Republican Party (Portugal), established 2015
Democratic-Republican Societies, local political organizations in the US active in the 1790s
Democratic Republican Union, a Venezuelan political party
Democratic Republicans (Italy)

See also
Democratic Party (disambiguation)
Republican Party (disambiguation)
Republican Democratic Movement, a Rwandan political party